Juan Manuel Cerúndolo was the defending champion but chose not to defend his title.

Cedrik-Marcel Stebe won the title after defeating Francesco Passaro 7–6(7–2), 6–4 in the final.

Seeds

Draw

Finals

Top half

Bottom half

References

External links
Main draw
Qualifying draw

Città di Como Challenger - 1
2022 Singles